Valerophenone, or butyl phenyl ketone, is an aromatic ketone with the formula C6H5C(O)C4H9.  It is a colorless liquid that is soluble in organic solvents. It is usually prepared by the acylation of benzene using valeryl chloride.

Selected reactions
Being prochiral, valerophenone undergoes enantioselective hydrogenation to the corresponding alcohol.

Its photochemistry has been studied.

Valerophenone is also an inhibitor of the enzyme carbonyl reductase.

See also
Acetophenone
Butyrophenone
Propiophenone

References

Aromatic ketones
Phenyl compounds